Overlook Mountain is the southernmost peak of the Catskill Escarpment in the central Catskill Mountains near Woodstock, New York. The centerpiece of the  Overlook Mountain Wild Forest area of Catskill Park, the mountain is the site of one of the remaining five Catskill Mountain fire towers and the Overlook Mountain House, a hotel which was built at a higher elevation than any other in the range.

Natural history 

Overlook Mountain is the southernmost peak of the Catskill Escarpment, which was formed of limestone bedrock by a period of glaciation.  It is one of the timber rattlesnake habitats in the Catskills. The summit is covered with red oak, red spruce, and balsam fir trees.

Cultural history 
Overlook Mountain was the site of one of the "mountain houses" which were constructed in the Catskills during the 1800s.  In 1902 its southern slopes became home to the Byrdcliffe Colony, a utopian settlement with an arts focus.

Fire tower 

The Overlook fire tower was originally constructed in 1927 on Gallis Hill, west of Kingston, New York, and was moved to its present location in 1950.  The  tower was used by fire stewards to more easily locate wildfires.  The tower, along with the others in the Catskills, were closed for safety reasons in 1988.  Overlook's tower was the first to reopen after renovations were completed, on June 5, 1999.

Mountain House 
The first hotel built on the mountain was designed and built by 1833 as interest in tourism in the area increased.  The structure was built with the intention to expand it, but was unable to compete effectively with the Catskill Mountain House.
The Overlook Mountain House, owned by Robert Livingston Pell and designed by Lewis B. Wagonen, opened in 1871.  At , it was at a higher elevation than the nearby Catskill Mountain House or other hotels in the area.  The hotel had capacity for 300 guests, and was destroyed by fire in 1875. The hotel was rebuilt by the Kiersted Brothers in 1875, and faced increasing competition from the Grand Hotel, Hotel Kaaterskill, and Laurel House.  In 1921 was the site of a secret organizational meeting of what was to become the Communist Labor Party of America.  The hotel again burned down in 1923, and architect Frank P. Amato was hired by owner Morris Newgold to redesign and rebuild it.
This design was never completely built, as the hotel's elevation and lack of rail transportation made it difficult for customers to reach the site, compounding owner Newgold's financial difficulties.  The State of New York acquired much of the land, and the hotel was boarded up in 1940.  Further fire damage in the mid-1960s brought down a roof-top tower which had remained standing until that point.  The ruins of the hotel are accessible from the main trail.

References

  Overlook Mountain Wild Forest: New York State - Department of Environmental Conservation
 Overlook Mountain Hiking Guide & Map of Trailhead

Mountains of Ulster County, New York
Woodstock, New York
Mountains of New York (state)